McHenry Township may refer to:

 McHenry Township, McHenry County, Illinois
 McHenry Township, Foster County, North Dakota, in Foster County, North Dakota
 McHenry Township, Lycoming County, Pennsylvania

Township name disambiguation pages